Lachhuar Jain temple is a Jain temples located in Lachhuar village near Jamui, Bihar. Lachhuar is one of the most important Jain pilgrimages in Bihar.

History 
According to Śvētāmbara tradition, Lachhuar a doorway to Kshatriyakund which is believed to be the birthplace of Mahavira. To commemorate his birthplace a large temple along with a dharamshala was constructed by Raja Dhanpat Singh Bahadur in 1857.

About temple 
This temple is part of Jain circuit of Bihar and is a popular Jain pilgrimage. This temple also temporarily housed the ancient 2,600 years idol of Mahavira from temple in Kshatriyakund. The temple also has a dharamshala equipped with all modern facilities and bhojnalaya.

References

Citation

Sources

External links

Jain temples in Bihar
19th-century Jain temples